At the River's Edge, by the rock band Styx is a single-disc version of Arch Allies: Live at Riverport, featuring only the Styx set, and including live versions of the tracks "Everything Is Cool" and "Lorelei" in place of the Jam versions of "Blue Collar Man" and "Roll with the Changes" that Styx performed with REO Speedwagon on that album.

Track listing
 "Everything Is Cool" (Tommy Shaw) - 4:55
 "The Grand Illusion" - (Dennis DeYoung) 5:38
 "Blue Collar Man (Long Nights)" (Shaw) - 4:58
 "Lorelei" (James "J.Y." Young, DeYoung) - 4:09
 "Fooling Yourself (The Angry Young Man)" (Shaw) - 6:18
 "Lady" (DeYoung) - 4:48
 "Brave New World" (Shaw, Young) - 5:41
 "Edge of the Century" (Glen Burtnik, Bob Berger) - 5:06
 "Heavy Water" (Young, Shaw) - 5:53
 "Too Much Time on My Hands (Shaw) - 5:22
 "Renegade" (Shaw) - 7:25

Personnel
Tommy Shaw
James "J.Y." Young
Lawrence Gowan
Glen Burtnik
Chuck Panozzo
Todd Sucherman

2002 live albums
Styx (band) live albums
Sanctuary Records live albums